Taboye  is a rural commune and village in the Cercle of Bourem in the Gao Region of south-eastern Mali. The commune is crossed by the River Niger and includes the villages of Bia, Dagha, Ha, Moudakane, Ouani, Tondibi and Taboye. In the 2009 census the commune had a population of 20,503.

References

External links
.

Communes of Gao Region
Communities on the Niger River